Simon Bennett or Bennet may refer to:

Simon Bennett (MP) for Warwick in 1404
Sir Simon Bennet, 1st Baronet (c. 1584–1631) Bennet baronets
Simon Bennett (director), see List of Outrageous Fortune episodes
Simon Bennett (referee) with Select Group
Simon Bennett, character in The Impossible (2012 film)
Simon Bennett (game developer), co-founder of Roll7
Simon Bennett, see 2010 United Kingdom general election, of the BNP and British Freedom Party

See also
Sion Bennett, Welsh rugby union player